Daniel Sikuta (born 28 December 1992) is a Kenyan rugby union player, currently playing for the  in the 2022 Currie Cup First Division. His preferred position is flanker.

Professional career
Sikuta was named in the  squad for the 2022 Currie Cup First Division.< Chenge is a Kenyan international in both 15-a-side and sevens.

References

External links
itsrugby.co.uk Profile

1992 births
Living people
Rugby union flankers
Kenyan rugby union players
Kenya international rugby union players
Simbas players